Gratiot's Grove was a mining settlement and later, a frontier fort, during the Black Hawk War, in Michigan Territory (later Lafayette County, Wisconsin).

History

In 1824, Henry Gratiot settled in the area with his brother and set up a mining and smelting operation. Later during the Black Hawk War, the settlement became Fort Gratiot. Today the Gratiot House still survives in what had been Gratiot's Grove.

Notes

Further reading 
 

Buildings and structures in Lafayette County, Wisconsin
Black Hawk War forts
Forts in Wisconsin
Pre-statehood history of Wisconsin
1824 establishments in Michigan Territory